Son of Rambow is a 2007 comedy film written and directed by Garth Jennings and inspired by First Blood. The film premiered on 22 January 2007 at the Sundance Film Festival. It was later shown at the Newport Beach Film Festival, Seattle International Film Festival, Toronto International Film Festival and Glasgow Film Festival. The film was also shown at the 51st BFI London Film Festival. Son of Rambow was released in the United Kingdom on 4 April 2008 and opened in limited release in the United States on 2 May 2008. Set over a summer during Thatcher's Britain, the film is a coming of age story about two schoolboys and their attempts to make an amateur film inspired by First Blood.

Plot
Will Proudfoot is a quiet and shy 11-year-old boy who comes from a family that belongs to the strict Plymouth Brethren church. Will is forbidden from watching films or television and is made to leave his classroom when the teacher puts on a documentary. In the corridor, he meets Lee Carter, the 12-year-old worst-behaved boy in school, thrown out of another class for bad behaviour. They accidentally break a fish bowl in the corridor; Lee volunteers to take the blame, pretending that the punishment is torture, in exchange for Will's watch, which belonged to his dead father. Moreover, Lee demands that Will performs the stunts in a film Lee is making with home video equipment owned by his 16-year-old bullying older brother, Lawrence, which Lawrence uses in his video bootlegging enterprise. He intends to enter the Screen Test Young Film-Makers' Competition.

Will accepts, after accidentally seeing the film First Blood at Lee's house while hiding from Lawrence. He becomes very enthusiastic, and plays several dangerous action scenes, culminating in the two boys becoming 'blood brothers' after Lee saves Will from drowning. Lee finds Will's sketch book, full of colourful and glorious ideas, and starts to incorporate some of them into his film script. The two become best friends, but Will has to keep it secret from his family and the increasingly interfering Brother Joshua of the Brethren, who clearly has designs on his mother.

French exchange students arrive and one of them, Didier Revol, becomes very popular. After finding Will's sketch book, he asks Will if he and his acolytes can play in the film, and Will agrees. Didier reveals that he has always wanted to be an actor. This mushrooms into the whole school being part of the production, and Will being included with the cool sixth-formers. Lee does not like this, as he is no longer in control, and finally quits after a fight with Will during filming of the last sequence, which takes place at a disused power station. After Will becomes trapped when part of the unstable structure collapses due to Didier's carelessness, and the entire school/crew run away, even Didier, Lee returns to rescue his friend, but uses the excuse that he has come to collect his brother's camera. He too gets hurt, and has to go to hospital. Lawrence visits him, but is angry about the fact that the camera is broken.

Will's mother, from whom he has struggled to hide his activities, finally realises that her son must be allowed to be himself and her family leaves the Brethren. The film is never submitted to the competition as they miss the deadline. The French students leave, and while Didier was popular and worshipped in Britain, his own school-mates mock him, and he is actually lonely and isolated. When Lawrence looks at Lee's footage he is impressed, and he sees Lee's rant at Will defending Lawrence's neglect and bullying, which was accidentally filmed. With Will's help, he adds a part in which he acts himself – including a reply message for his brother. When Lee leaves the hospital, he is brought to a cinema by surprise. His film is shown before the main feature (much to the enjoyment of the audience) and the two boys reunite.

Cast

Production
Son of Rambow is a project that Garth Jennings and Nick Goldsmith — collectively known as Hammer & Tongs — worked on for some years. Its development was interrupted when they were asked to make The Hitchhiker's Guide to the Galaxy, and it is their second major feature film. It was inspired by Jennings' own experiences as a child in the 1980s, when video equipment first became available to the public, and the film recreates the atmosphere of an English comprehensive school of the time, using a soundtrack of both familiar and lesser known pop tracks from the era. The film was shot primarily in the English town of Berkhamsted, and the nearby Ashridge Estate owned and managed by the National Trust for Places of Historic Interest or Natural Beauty Hertfordshire: featuring Ashlyns School and The Rex, a recently refurbished listed Art Deco cinema which had been left derelict between 1989 and 2004.

The two roads where both boys live are approximately 1,200 metres apart, being located next to Berkhamsted Castle. They are the two most exclusive residential roads in the town. The film also shot at the Richborough Power Station in Sandwich, which was then disused. The film includes a vintage clip of Jan Pinkava winning the BBC Screen Test competition. The minor role of Danny, an acolyte of Didier, a glamorous French exchange student, is played by Stanley Kubrick's grandson, Sam Kubrick-Finney. The film includes excerpts from First Blood and is endorsed by Sylvester Stallone, the star of the Rambo franchise.

Reception

Critical response
Son of Rambow received generally favourable reviews from critics. On Rotten Tomatoes the film has a "Certified Fresh" approval rating of 73% based on reviews from 118 critics. The site's consensus is: "Undeniable heart and charming young leads save the film's nostalgic storyline from suffering at the hands predictability." On Metacritic the film has a score of 66 out of 100, based on 29 reviews, indicating "generally favorable reviews".

Roger Ebert of the Chicago Sun-Times gave the film a positive review and wrote: "After the movie, I imagined its writer-director, Garth Jennings (The Hitchhiker's Guide to the Galaxy) being more than a little like Will, and the movie uncannily similar to one of Will's comic epics." Desson Thomson of The Washington Post wrote: "We cringe and laugh at -- and are ultimately moved by -- their clumsiness and innocence. And it endears us to the Rambo films in ways we never could have anticipated." Kimberley Jones of The Austin Chronicle called it "Funny and sweet and guaranteed to flood you with good feeling", and Ty Burr of the Boston Globe called it "an absolute delight."

David Morrell, the author who created the character of John Rambo, called it "a tender, charming story". Stallone saw the film and sent a note to the filmmakers saying he loved it.

Accolades

The film appeared on several critics' top ten lists of the best films of 2008. Both Kimberly Jones of The Austin Chronicle and Ty Burr of The Boston Globe named it their eighth best, and Marc Savlov of The Austin Chronicle named it his ninth.

The film won the Empire Award for Best Comedy.
Garth Jennings was nominated for a BAFTA in the Most Promising Newcomer category. The film was named one of the Top Ten Independent Films by the National Board of Review in 2008.

Home media
Son of Rambow was released on DVD and Blu-ray in the United Kingdom on 11 August 2008, and on DVD in the United States on 26 August 2008.

Musical 
A stage musical adaptation has been workshopped by Nuffield Southampton Theatres (NST) in association with The Other Palace in London where it was presented from 24 May to 2 June 2018. It was directed by Nuffield Southampton Theatres' Artistic Director Samuel Hodges, with music by Miranda Cooper and Nick Coler, lyrics by Cooper and Richard Marsh and book by Marsh.

References

External links
 
 
 Son of Rambow entry in the 2007 Sundance Film Festival film guide
 Garth Jennings interview at FutureMovies

2007 films
2007 independent films
English-language French films
English-language German films
2000s French-language films
British coming-of-age comedy films
French coming-of-age comedy films
German coming-of-age comedy films
Films about films
Films about filmmaking
Films about religion
Films directed by Garth Jennings
Films set in 1983
Films set in London
Films set in the 1980s
Films shot in Hampshire
Films shot in Hertfordshire
Films shot in Kent
Films shot in London
Rambo (franchise)
Films shot at Elstree Film Studios
Paramount Vantage films
StudioCanal films
Arte France Cinéma films
American coming-of-age comedy films
2000s American films
2000s British films
2000s French films
2000s German films